William Schickel (1919July 14, 2009) was an American spiritual artist and liturgical architect. His stained glass, painting, sculpture, furniture, and building design is characterized by neo-Thomism and modernism and is influenced by the writings of Jacques Maritain.

Biography
Schickel was born in 1919 in Stamford, Connecticut, the grandson of German-American architect J. William Schickel, and grew up in Ithaca, New York. As a student at the University of Notre Dame, he studied under the philosopher Yves Simon and the stained-glass artist Emil Frei, Jr., whose daughter Mary he would soon marry. He graduated from Notre Dame in 1944.

The Schickels moved to Loveland, Ohio, so that Mary could be close to Grailville, the national headquarters of the Grail movement of which she was a member. William Schickel established a design studio there in 1948. The Schickels had five sons and six daughters, including Iowa politician and broadcast executive Bill Schickel. In 1952, William Schickel was diagnosed with lymphoma, which went into remission after a pilgrimage to St. Charles, Missouri.

On July 14, 2009, Schickel died in Loveland of complications from pneumonia. The William Schickel Gallery in Loveland has continued to display his works.

Notable works
Over his more than 60-year career, Schickel was involved in the design or renovation of many liturgical structures. One of his earliest works was the conversion of a 1813 barn in Loveland into the Grailville Oratory. He won an Architects Society of Ohio award for the 1960s renovation of the Abbey of Our Lady of Gethsemani, the oldest Trappist abbey in the United States, in which the Gothic Revival vaulting was replaced by a minimalist design in keeping with Second Vatican Council reforms. His other liturgical commissions include Bellarmine Chapel at Xavier University in Cincinnati and the Shrine of St. Rose Philippine Duchesne in St. Charles, Missouri, an early example of a church in the round.

Schickel's secular works include the Rotunda of Creation at the Mercy Centers for Health and Wellness in Anderson Township and Fairfield, Ohio, and the Kane County Correctional Complex in Aurora, Illinois.

References

Further reading

External links
William Schickel Gallery

1919 births
2009 deaths
Architects from Cincinnati
Architects of Roman Catholic churches
Artists from Cincinnati
Artists from Ithaca, New York
Artists from Stamford, Connecticut
Catholic painters
Catholic sculptors
Catholics from Ohio
Deaths from pneumonia in Ohio
Modernist architects from the United States
People from Loveland, Ohio
University of Notre Dame alumni